This is a list of places in Republic of Ireland which have standing links to local communities in other countries known as "town twinning" (usually in Europe) or "sister cities" (usually in the rest of the world). In the Republic of Ireland, this association is formalised by local government.

A
Adare

 Buckow, Germany
 Villecresnes, France

Ardee
 Nettuno, Italy

Arklow

 Aberystwyth, Wales, United Kingdom
 Châteaudun, France

Askeaton
 Montbron, France

Athboy

 Béthancourt-en-Valois, France
 Feigneux, France
 Fresnoy-la-Rivière, France
 Gilocourt, France
 Glaignes, France
 Morienval, France
 Orrouy, France
 Russy-Bémont, France
 Séry-Magneval, France

Athenry

 Quimperlé, France
 Renews-Cappahayden, Canada

Athlone
 Châteaubriant, France

Athy
 Grandvilliers, France

Avoca
 Bromham, England, United Kingdom

B
Bagenalstown
 Pont-Péan, France

Balbriggan

 Belmar, United States
 Sankt Wendel, Germany

Ballina

 Athis-Mons, France
 Pittsfield, United States
 Scranton, United States

Ballinasloe

 Chalonnes-sur-Loire, France
 Moyle, Northern Ireland, United Kingdom

Ballincollig

 Mechterstädt (Hörsel), Germany
 Saclay, France

Ballybay
 Osterhofen, Germany

Ballydehob
 Cléden-Cap-Sizun, France

Ballylanders
 Wyandotte County, United States

Ballymahon

 Landaul, France
 Landévant, France

Ballymakeera
 Lanrivain, France

Ballymoe
 Boys Town, United States

Ballyshannon

 Grenay, France
 Séné, France

Ballyvourney
 Trémargat, France

Balrothery
 Landéan, France

Bandon
 Bandon, United States

Bantry

 La Crosse, United States
 Pont-l'Abbé, France

Beaufort
 Beaufort, United States

Blackrock
 Vincennes, France

Bray

 Bègles, France
 Dublin, United States
 Würzburg, Germany

Buncrana

 Campbellsville, United States
 Fréhel, France
 Plévenon, France

Bundoran is a member of the Douzelage, a town twinning association of towns across the European Union, alongside with:

 Agros, Cyprus
 Altea, Spain
 Asikkala, Finland
 Bad Kötzting, Germany
 Bellagio, Italy
 Chojna, Poland
 Granville, France
 Holstebro, Denmark
 Houffalize, Belgium
 Judenburg, Austria
 Kőszeg, Hungary
 Marsaskala, Malta
 Meerssen, Netherlands
 Niederanven, Luxembourg
 Oxelösund, Sweden
 Preveza, Greece
 Rokiškis, Lithuania
 Rovinj, Croatia
 Sesimbra, Portugal
 Sherborne, England, United Kingdom
 Sigulda, Latvia
 Siret, Romania
 Škofja Loka, Slovenia
 Sušice, Czech Republic
 Tryavna, Bulgaria
 Türi, Estonia
 Zvolen, Slovakia

C
Cahir
 Scarborough, England, United Kingdom

Cappamore
 Langonnet, France

Cappoquin
 Chanat-la-Mouteyre, France

County Carlow
 Davenport, United States

Carlow 

 Dole, France
 Northwich, England, United Kingdom
 Tempe, United States

Carndonagh
 St. Charles, United States

Carrickmacross
 Carhaix-Plouguer, France

Carrigaline

 Guidel, France
 Kirchseeon, Germany

Cashel is a member of the Charter of European Rural Communities, a town twinning association across the European Union, alongside with:

 Bienvenida, Spain
 Bièvre, Belgium
 Bucine, Italy
 Cissé, France
 Desborough, England, United Kingdom
 Esch (Haaren), Netherlands
 Hepstedt, Germany
 Ibănești, Romania
 Kandava (Tukums), Latvia
 Kannus, Finland
 Kolindros, Greece
 Lassee, Austria
 Medzev, Slovakia
 Moravče, Slovenia
 Næstved, Denmark
 Nagycenk, Hungary
 Nadur, Malta
 Ockelbo, Sweden
 Pano Lefkara, Cyprus
 Põlva, Estonia
 Samuel (Soure), Portugal
 Slivo Pole, Bulgaria
 Starý Poddvorov, Czech Republic
 Strzyżów, Poland
 Tisno, Croatia
 Troisvierges, Luxembourg
 Žagarė (Joniškis), Lithuania

Castlebar

 Dixon, United States
 Höchstadt an der Aisch, Germany
 Peekskill, United States

Castleblayney
 Marseillan, France

Castlecomer
 Penvénan, France

Castleisland
 Bannalec, France

Cavan
 Jaunay-Marigny, France

Charleville

 Plouaret, France
 Le Vieux-Marché, France

County Clare

 Clare and Gilbert Valleys, Australia
 Newry, Mourne and Down, Northern Ireland, United Kingdom

Clifden

 Coyoacán (Mexico City), Mexico
 Plouarzel, France

Clonakilty
 Waldaschaff, Germany

Clonmel

 Costa Masnaga, Italy
 Eysines, France
 Gangi, Italy
 Peoria, United States
 Reading, England, United Kingdom
 Trofaiach, Austria

Cobh

 Cruzeiro, Brazil
 Kolbuszowa, Poland
 Lake Charles, United States
 Pontarddulais, Wales, United Kingdom
 Ploërmel, France

County Cork

 Cook County, United States
 Miami-Dade County, United States

Cork

 Cologne, Germany
 Coventry, England, United Kingdom
 Manizales, Colombia
 Rennes, France
 San Francisco, United States
 Shanghai, China
 Swansea, Wales, United Kingdom

Corofin
 Tonquédec, France

Cúil Aodha
 Peumerit-Quintin, France

D
Dingle

 Tolfa, Italy
 West Springfield, United States

County Donegal
 St. Louis, United States

Drogheda

 Bronte, Italy
 Saint-Mandé, France
 Salinas, United States

Drumshanbo
 Locquirec, France

Dublin

 Barcelona, Spain
 Beijing, China
 Liverpool, England, United Kingdom
 San Jose, United States

Dún Laoghaire

 Brest, France
 Isle of Anglesey, Wales, United Kingdom

Dundalk

 Pikeville, United States
 Rezé, France

Dungarvan
 Erie, United States

Dunmanway
 Quéven, France

Dunmore
 Querrien, France

E
Ennis

 Langenfeld, Germany
 Phoenix, United States
 Saint-Paul-de-Fenouillet, France

Enniscorthy
 Gimont, France

F
Fermoy
 Ploemeur, France

Ferns
 Yelm, United States

County Fingal
 Chengdu, China

G
Galway

 Aalborg, Denmark
 Bradford, England, United Kingdom
 Cambridge, United States
 Chicago, United States
 Lorient, France
 Menlo Park, United States
 Milwaukee, United States
 Seattle, United States
 St. Louis, United States

Gorey
 Oban, Scotland, United Kingdom

Greystones
 Holyhead, Wales, United Kingdom

H
Hacketstown
 Hackettstown, United States

Headford

 Le Faouët, France
 Morgan Hill, United States

I
Inniscarra
 Plougonven, France

K
Kanturk
 Rostrenen, France

Kilcullen
 Saint-Contest, France

County Kildare

 Deauville, France
 Lexington, United States

Kildare
 Corps-Nuds, France

Kilkee
 Plouhinec, France

County Kilkenny
 Kilkenny, United States

Kilkenny

 Formigine, Italy
 Malbork, Poland

Killaloe
 New London, United States

Killarney

 Casperia, Italy
 Castiglione di Sicilia, Italy
 Concord, United States
 Cooper City, United States
 Kendal, England, United Kingdom
 Myrtle Beach, United States
 Pleinfeld, Germany

 Scottsdale, United States
 Springfield, United States
 Staffanstorp, Sweden

Killorglin 
 Plouha, France

Kilnamartyra
 Kergrist-Moëlou, France

Kilrush
 Plouzané, France

Kinsale

 Antibes, France

 Newport, United States

L
Lahinch
 Arzon, France

County Laois
 Franklin, United States

Laragh
 Otročiněves, Czech Republic

Leixlip

 Bressuire, France
 Niles, United States

Letterkenny

 Elizabethtown, United States
 Rudolstadt, Germany

County Limerick

 Debrecen, Hungary
 Hohenlohe (district), Germany
 New Brunswick, United States

Limerick

 Kansas City, United States
 Limerick Township, United States
 Lowell, United States
 Quimper, France
 Santa Clara, United States
 Spokane, United States

Lismore
 Lismore, Australia

Listowel

 Downpatrick, Northern Ireland, United Kingdom
 Listowel (North Perth), Canada
 Los Gatos, United States
 Panissières, France
 Shawnee, United States

Longford

 Huixquilucan, Mexico
 Noyal-Châtillon-sur-Seiche, France
 Sparks, United States

Loughshinny
 Quistinic, France

Louisburgh

 Louisbourg (Cape Breton), Canada
 Moëlan-sur-Mer, France

Lusk
 Thorigné-Fouillard, France

M
Macroom

 Bubry, France
 Marcallo con Casone, Italy

Mallow

 Tinley Park, United States
 Tréguier, France

Maynooth
 Canet-en-Roussillon, France

County Mayo

 Calderdale, England, United Kingdom
 Cleveland, United States
 Marijampolė, Lithuania

County Meath

 Cary, United States
 Guiyang, China

Millstreet
 Pommerit-le-Vicomte, France

County Monaghan

 Cavan Monaghan, Canada
 Geel, Belgium
 Miramichi, Canada
 Peterborough, Canada
 Prince Edward Island, Canada

Monasterboice
 Letham, Scotland, United Kingdom

Murroe
 Évry-Grégy-sur-Yerre, France

N
Naas

 Allaire, France
 Casalattico, Italy
 Dillingen an der Donau, Germany
 Omaha, United States
 St Davids, Wales, United Kingdom

Navan

 Bobbio, Italy
 Broccostella, Italy

Nenagh
 Tonnerre, France

New Ross

 Hartford, United States
 Moncoutant, France
 Newcastle, Northern Ireland, United Kingdom

Newbridge

 Argentré-du-Plessis, France
 Bad Lippspringe, Germany
 Ocala, United States

O
Oldcastle
 Tecumseh, Canada

Oranmore
 Clohars-Fouesnant, France

P
Passage West
 Chasseneuil-du-Poitou, France

Portlaoise
 Arlington, United States

R
Rathcoole
 École-Valentin, France

County Roscommon
 Tucson, United States

Roscommon
 Chartrettes, France

Roundwood
 Spézet, France

Rush

 Gourin, France
 San Mauro Castelverde, Italy

S
Schull
 Guilvinec, France

Shannon
 Guingamp, France

Sixmilebridge
 Nort-sur-Erdre, France

Skerries
 Guichen, France

Sligo

 Crozon, France
 Everett, United States
 Kempten, Germany
 Tallahassee, United States

County South Dublin

 Brent, England, United Kingdom
 Katowice, Poland
 Tampa, United States

Swords
 Ozoir-la-Ferrière, France

T
Taghmaconnell
 Downey, United States

Templemore

 Potenza Picena, Italy
 Prémilhat, France

Thurles
 Bollington, England, United Kingdom

Tipperary

 Mautern in Steiermark, Austria
 Parthenay, France

Tralee

 Beit Sahour, Palestine
 Holyoke, United States
 Springfield, United States
 Westlake, United States

Trim
 Étrépagny, France

Tuam
 Straubing, Germany

Tullamore
 Chandler, United States

Tydavnet
 Geel, Belgium

W
Waterford

 Haikou, China
 Rochester, United States
 Saint-Herblain, France
 St. John's, Canada

Westport

 Limavady, Northern Ireland, United Kingdom
 Plougastel-Daoulas, France

County Wexford
 Yanga, Mexico

Wexford

 Annapolis, United States
 Couëron, France
 Fleurus, Belgium
 Lugo, Italy

Whitegate
 Péchabou, France

County Wicklow
 Würzburg, Germany

Wicklow

 Eichenzell, Germany
 Montigny-le-Bretonneux, France
 Porthmadog, Wales, United Kingdom

References

Ireland
Lists of populated places in the Republic of Ireland
Foreign relations of Ireland
Ireland geography-related lists
Cities in the Republic of Ireland